Hold an Old Friend's Hand is the second studio album by American pop singer Tiffany, released in November 1988. The album was commercially successful, achieving a platinum certification, peaking at #17 on the U.S. charts and yielding one top-ten single ("All This Time") and another in the top 40 ("Radio Romance"); however, it did not equal the multi-platinum success of her debut album, which had two #1 singles on the Billboard Hot 100.

In Tiffany's summer tour, where she was to once again have the New Kids on the Block as her opening act as she did the year before, the sudden popularity of the New Kids caused their roles to be reversed, with Tiffany opening for them, although they were officially billed as co-headliners.

The title track is a cover, though the original version, released by Tracy Nelson in 1974, was not famous enough to be widely known when the album was released. It was written by Donna Weiss, who also co-wrote "Bette Davis Eyes", a hit for Kim Carnes (another artist for whom Tiffany's manager/producer George Tobin has produced records). It was an unusual song to be sung by somebody so young (Tiffany was 17 at the time), as its lyrics seem to be sung from a perspective of many years' experience.

"Hearts Never Lie" is a duet with Chris Farren, who went on to some country music success.

The final track, "Overture", is an instrumental acoustic guitar performance by Grant Geissman. It includes the tunes to several of the songs from this album, and is an unusual track to have on a teen pop album, especially since Tiffany is not involved in the track.

Critical reception 

Upon its release, Hold an Old Friend's Hand received mixed reviews from critics. Jimmy Guterman of Rolling Stone gave this album a negative review, stating that the record is "full of the same brand of synthesizer-heavy teen pop, with all hands trying to fill in the massive holes left by the Tiff's weak warble."

Music critic Robert Christgau gave the album a "B-", stating that "[Her] maturity doesn't become her--exchanging schlock-rock remakes for still more Hollywood readymades, she's hellbent for biz divahood and may well get there."

In a retrospective review by Bryan Buss of AllMusic, he states that it is a "stronger, more complete package than the first, showcased a more mature image and sound without much alteration of the misunderstood-teen theme that brought her first success." Although he praised "We're Both Thinking of Her," "Walk Away While You Can," and "Drop That Bomb" for being perfect pop-jingles, he criticized "It's the Lover (Not the Love)" for "[sounding] like she's shouting" and "I'll Be the Girl" for being "somewhat grating", though, he also praised them for being "undeniably catchy".

Track listing

B-sides 
"Can't Stop a Heartbeat" (Paul Mark, John Edward Duarte) - 4:45 / long version - 4:52
"Gotta Be Love" (Paul Mark, John Edward Duarte) - 4:18
"Ruthless" (Donna Weiss, John Duarte) - 4:44 / video version - 3:38

Personnel 
 Tiffany – vocals (1-10), backing vocals (2, 3, 5-10)
 John Duarte – keyboards (1-5, 7, 8), drum programming (1-5, 7, 8), arrangements (1-5, 7, 8, 10), keyboard solo (7), additional keyboards (9, 10)
 Mike Piccirillo – keyboards (6, 9), guitars (6), guitar solo (6), drum programming (6, 9), arrangements (6, 9), backing vocals (9)
 Hugh James – acoustic piano (10), Yamaha DX7 (10)
 Michael Thompson – guitars (1, 2, 3, 5, 9), guitar solo (1, 2, 5, 9)
 Grant Geissman – guitars (8, 10), guitar solo (10), acoustic guitar (11)
 Henry Newmark – Simmons toms (7)
 Richard Elliot – saxophone solo (3, 4), saxophone (8)
 Stuart Levin – strings (7)
 Steve McClintock – backing vocals (2)
 Julia Waters – backing vocals (4)
 Maxine Waters – backing vocals (4)
 Terry Wood – backing vocals (5, 9)
 Chris Farren – lead vocals (10)
 Tommy Funderburk – backing vocals (10)

Production 
 George Tobin – producer, management 
 Bill Smith – engineer, mixing (1-4, 6-11)
 John Kliner – mixing (5), additional engineer (6, 8, 9, 10)
 Michael Mikulka – additional engineer (5)
 John Kerns – additional engineer (10)
 Howard Lee Wolen – additional engineer (10)
 Bill Womack – chief technical advisor 
 Brenda Farrell – production coordinator 
 Carole Kliner – production coordinator 
 Lisa LeFever – production coordinator 
 Jeanne Bradshaw – art direction, design  
 Herb Ritts – photography 
 Sharon Simonaire – stylist 
 Sally Herschberger – hair stylist 
 Kathy Jeung – make-up

Charts

Weekly charts

Year-end charts

Certifications and sales

References

1988 albums
Tiffany Darwish albums
MCA Records albums